Vostok Rupes is an escarpment on Mercury. The scarp is a surface manifestation of a thrust fault, which formed when the planet contracted as its interior cooled.

Vostok Rupes cuts across the crater Guido d'Arezzo and across a larger, unnamed crater to the northwest.

Vostok Rupes is named after Russian ship Vostok, which led the First Russian Antarctic Expedition in 1819–1821, commanded by Fabian Gottlieb von Bellingshausen.

References

Scarps on Mercury